The term "The Armada" may refer to:

The Spanish fleet that sailed against England in 1588 known as the Spanish Armada
An Irish rock band fronted by Jeff Martin of The Tea Party called "The Armada"
The Armada (album) by the band
The Armada (book) by Garrett Mattingly
The Armada (poem) by Thomas Babington Macaulay
A named train between Plymouth and London Paddington operated by Great Western Railway